Daniel Sexton Gurney (April 13, 1931 – January 14, 2018) was an American racing driver, race car constructor, and team owner who reached racing's highest levels starting in 1958. Gurney won races in the Formula One, Indy Car, NASCAR, Can-Am, and Trans-Am Series. Gurney is the first of three drivers to have won races in sports cars (1958), Formula One (1962), NASCAR (1963), and Indy cars (1967), the other two being Mario Andretti and Juan Pablo Montoya.

In 1967, after winning the 24 Hours of Le Mans together with A. J. Foyt, Gurney spontaneously sprayed champagne while celebrating on the podium, which thereafter became a custom at many motorsports events. As owner of All American Racers, he was the first to put a simple right-angle extension on the upper trailing edge of the rear wing. This device, called a Gurney flap, increases downforce and, if well designed, imposes only a relatively small increase in aerodynamic drag. At the 1968 German Grand Prix, he became the first driver ever to use a full face helmet in Grand Prix racing.

Early life
Gurney was born to John R. "Jack" Gurney and Roma Sexton. His father was a graduate of Harvard Business School with a master's degree. Dan's three uncles were each MIT engineers. His grandfather was F.W. Gurney who was responsible for the invention of the Gurney Ball Bearing. He had one sister, Celisssa. Jack was discovered to have a beautiful voice after taking voice lessons in Paris and changed his career path to become lead basso with the Metropolitan Opera Company in New York, eventually retiring in 1947. Jack moved his family to Riverside, California, when Dan was a teenager and had just graduated from Manhasset High School. Young Dan quickly became caught up in the California hot rod culture. At age 19, he built and raced a car that went 138 miles per hour (mph) (222 kilometres per hour [km/h]) at the Bonneville Salt Flats. He later studied at Menlo Junior College, a feeder school for Stanford University. He then became an amateur drag racer and sports car racer. He served in the United States Army for two years as an artillery mechanic during the Korean War.

Formula One career

Driver

Gurney's first major break occurred in the fall of 1957 when he was invited to test Frank Arciero's Arciero Special. It was powered by a 4.2-litre reworked Maserati engine with Ferrari running gear, and a Sports Car Engineering Mistral body. This ill-handling brute of a car was very fast, but even top drivers like Carroll Shelby and Ken Miles had found it difficult to handle. He finished second in the inaugural Riverside Grand Prix (behind Shelby), beating established stars like Masten Gregory, Walt Hansgen and Phil Hill. This attracted the attention of famed Ferrari North American importer Luigi Chinetti, who arranged for a factory ride for the young driver at Le Mans in 1958. Gurney, teamed with fellow Californian Bruce Kessler, had worked the car up to fifth overall and handed over to Kessler, who was then caught up in an accident. This performance and others earned him a test run in a works Ferrari, and his Formula One career began with the team in 1959. In just four races that first year, he earned two podium finishes, but the team's strict management style did not suit him.
In 1960 he had six non-finishes in seven races behind the wheel of a factory-prepared BRM. At the Dutch Grand Prix, at Zandvoort, a brake system failure on the BRM caused the most serious accident of his career, breaking his arm, killing a young spectator and instilling in him a longstanding distrust of engineers. The accident also caused him to make a change in his driving style that later paid dividends: his tendency to use his brakes more sparingly than his rivals meant that they lasted longer, especially in endurance races.

Gurney was particularly noted for an exceptionally fluid driving style. On rare occasions, as when his car fell behind with minor mechanical troubles and he felt he had nothing to lose, he would abandon his classic technique and adopt a more aggressive (and riskier) style. This circumstance produced what many observers consider the finest driving performance of his career, when a punctured tire put him nearly two laps down halfway through the 1967 Rex Mays 300 Indycar race at Riverside, California. He produced an inspired effort, made up the deficit and won the race with a dramatic last-lap pass of runner-up Bobby Unser.

He came very close to scoring a maiden victory at Reims, France, in 1961, but his reluctance to block Ferrari driver Giancarlo Baghetti (a move Gurney regarded as dangerous and unsportsmanlike) allowed Baghetti to pass him at the finish line for the win. One week later, he repeated the success in a non-Championship F1 race in front of Porsche's home crowd at Stuttgart's Solitude Racetrack. Due to the high costs of racing in F1, Porsche did not continue after the 1962 season. While with Porsche, Gurney met a team public relations executive named Evi Butz, and they married several years later.

Gurney was the first driver hired by Jack Brabham to drive with him for the Brabham Racing Organisation. Brabham scored the maiden victory for his car at the 1963 Solitude race, but Gurney took the team's first win in a championship race in 1964 at Rouen. In all, he earned two wins (in 1964) and ten podiums (including five consecutive in 1965) for Brabham before leaving to start his own team. With his victory in the Eagle-Weslake at the 1967 Belgian Grand Prix, Gurney earned a distinction as the only driver in history to score maiden Grand Prix victories for three different manufacturers: Porsche, Brabham and Anglo-American Racers.

Due to his popularity, Car and Driver magazine promoted the idea that Gurney run for President of the United States in 1964. This effort was abandoned only when it was "discovered" that he was too young to qualify as a candidate. The campaign was periodically resurrected (usually every four years) by his friends and fans.

Gurney developed a new kind of motorcycle called "Alligator", which featured an extremely low seat position. While Gurney did not achieve his goal of getting the design licensed for manufacture and sale by a major motorcycle manufacturer, the initial production run of 36 Alligator motorcycles quickly sold out and are now prized collector's items.

Gurney's tall height, unusual for a race driver, caused constant problems during his career. During the 1.5-litre era of Formula 1, Gurney's head and shoulders extended high into the windstream compared to his shorter competitors, giving him (he felt) an aerodynamic disadvantage in the tiny, underpowered cars. In a fortunate error, the Italian coachbuilder who built the body for the 1964 Le Mans class-winning, closed-cockpit Cobra Daytona GT coupe driven by Gurney and Bob Bondurant mistakenly made the cockpit "greenhouse" two inches too tall — the only thing that permitted Gurney to fit in the car comfortably.

Manufacturer

In 1962, Gurney and Carroll Shelby began dreaming of building an American racing car to compete with the best European makes. Shelby convinced Goodyear, which wanted to challenge Firestone's domination of American racing at the time, to sponsor the team. Goodyear's president Victor Holt suggested the name, "All American Racers", and the team was formed in 1965. Gurney was not comfortable with the name at first, fearing it sounded somewhat jingoistic, but felt compelled to agree to his benefactor's suggestion.

Their initial focus was Indianapolis and Goodyear's battle with Firestone. Because Gurney's first love was road racing, especially in Europe, he wanted to win the Formula One World Championship while driving an American Grand Prix 'Eagle'. The car has often been characterised as a primarily British-based effort; in later interviews, Gurney was clear that the car was designed and built by crew members based in the All American Racers Southern California-based facility. Partnered with British engine maker Weslake, the Formula One effort was called "Anglo American Racers." The Weslake V12 engine was not ready for the 1966 Grand Prix season so the team used outdated four-cylinder, 2.7-litre Coventry-Climax engines for their first appearance in the second race of the year in Belgium. This was the race of the sudden torrential downpour captured in the feature film Grand Prix. Although Gurney completed the race in seventh place, he was unclassified. Gurney scored the team's first Championship points three weeks later by finishing fifth in the French Grand Prix at Reims.

The next season the team failed to finish any of the first three races, but on June 18, 1967, Gurney took a historic victory in the Belgian Grand Prix. Starting in the middle of the first row, Gurney initially followed Jim Clark's Lotus and the BRM of Jackie Stewart. A poor start left Gurney deep in the field at the end of the first lap. Throughout the race, Gurney's Weslake V-12 suffered a high-speed misfire, but he was able to continue racing. Jim Clark encountered problems on Lap 12 that dropped him down to ninth position. Having moved up to second spot, Gurney set the fastest lap of the race on Lap 19. Two laps later he and his Eagle took the lead and came home over a minute ahead of Stewart.

This win came just a week after his surprise victory with A. J. Foyt at 24 hours of Le Mans, where Gurney spontaneously began the now-familiar winner's tradition of spraying champagne from the podium to celebrate the unexpected win against the Ferraris and the other Ford GT40 teams. Gurney said later that he took great satisfaction in proving wrong the critics (including some members of the Ford team) who predicted the two great drivers, normally heated rivals, would break their car in an effort to show each other up.

Unfortunately, the victory in Belgium was the high point for AAR as engine problems continued to plague the Eagle. Despite the antiquated engine tooling used by the Weslake factory (dating from World War I), failures rarely stemmed from the engine design itself, but more often from unreliable peripheral systems like fuel pumps, fuel injection and the oil delivery system. He led the 1967 German Grand Prix at the Nürburgring when a driveshaft failed two laps from the end with a 42-second lead in hand. After a third-place finish in Canada that year, the car would finish only one more race. By the end of the 1968 season, Gurney was driving a McLaren-Ford. His last Formula One race was the 1970 British Grand Prix.

Legacy
Among American Formula One drivers, his 86 Grand Prix starts ranks third, and his total of four GP wins is second only to Mario Andretti. Perhaps the greatest tribute to Gurney's driving ability, however, was paid by the father of Scottish World Champion Jim Clark. The elder Clark took Gurney aside at his son's funeral in 1968 and confided that he was the only driver Clark had ever feared on the track. (Horton, 1999).

The 2010 Monterey Motorsports Reunion (formerly the Monterey Historic Automobile Races) was held in honor of Gurney.

A 2016 academic paper reported a mathematical modeling study that assessed the relative influence of driver and machine. Gurney was ranked the 14th-best Formula One driver of all time.

American Championship Car

While competing in Formula One, Gurney also raced each year in the Indianapolis 500 from 1962 to 1970. Gurney made his Indy début at the wheel of a space-frame, rear-engined car designed by John Crosthwaite and built by American hot-rodder Mickey Thompson Despite a misfiring engine, Gurney ran comfortably in the top 10 until a transmission seal failed on the 92nd lap. The next year he drove for Team Lotus and finished 7th. He failed to finish in his next four appearances in the 500 mile race, but beginning in 1968 until his last attempt in 1970 he finished 2nd, 2nd, and 3rd, respectively.  In 1969, he did not race in Formula One, instead racing in the USAC Championship Car series and also in CanAm.  He started a total of 28 Champ Car races, winning 7 times among his 18 top tens.  In 1969, he finished 4th in total points, despite starting only half the races of most top drivers (and would have finished second in the season standings to champion Mario Andretti if not for a driveshaft failure while leading comfortably with three laps remaining in the season finale at Riverside).  In 1968, he finished 7th with only 5 starts.

NASCAR / SCCA Trans-Am career

Gurney's first career NASCAR start was in 1962. In 1963, he drove a Holman-Moody Ford to fifth place in the Daytona 500.
Gurney was nearly unbeatable in a NASCAR Grand National car at Riverside International Raceway in California. Four of his five victories came with the famed Wood Brothers, in 1964, 1965, 1966 and 1968, in cars all numbered 121 (a simple graphic addition to the team's traditional "21"). The serial success of the Gurney/Wood Brothers combination did not sit well with NASCAR officials, so in 1967 Gurney signed to drive a Mercury for Bill Stroppe and legendary NASCAR crew chief Bud Moore. However, the 1967 Motor Trend 500 was won by Gurney's teammate, Parnelli Jones after Gurney retired with engine troubles. 
He also won the pole for the 1970 Riverside race in a Plymouth Superbird.  Gurney is credited with numerous appearances in NASCAR Grand American stockcars, a pony car division that existed between 1968 and 1971, but these results came in races co-sanctioned with SCCA's Trans-Am, where Dan competed regularly for Mercury, and later Plymouth.

At about the time Gurney began making occasional appearances in stock cars in the United States, Dan took a Chevrolet Impala to England and entered it in several "saloon car" (sedan) races. In a race at Silverstone in 1962, he led the local Jaguar drivers handily until a wheel broke. When he returned with the same car for a race three months later, the local club's technical inspectors disallowed his entry.

Gurney and his protege Swede Savage drove factory-sponsored, AAR built Plymouth Barracudas in the 1970 Trans-Am Series. Cutbacks at Chrysler forced Gurney to cut back to a one-car effort mid-season with Savage driving. In his swan song as a driver, in October 1970 Gurney returned for the season finale at his beloved Riverside, finishing fifth.

In 1980, Gurney came out of a 10-year retirement to help old friend Les Richter, the president of Riverside. (Gurney's adoption of the number that became most closely identified with his career, 48, was a nod to Richter's NFL number.) Gurney agreed to drive a second Rod Osterlund Chevrolet for one NASCAR race as teammate to 1979 rookie of the year Dale Earnhardt. For added publicity and supposedly as a condition of allowing Gurney to drive in the race after a 10-year layoff, Richter insisted that Gurney attend the racing school run by former teammate and friend Bob Bondurant (Gurney and Bondurant had shared the GT-class-winning Cobra Daytona coupe at Le Mans in 1964). After Gurney's refresher session, Richter called Bondurant and asked how Gurney had done. "He didn't need a refresher," Bondurant reportedly told Richter. "He was faster than me then, and he still is." Ticket sales surged upon the announcement of Gurney's return.  In a Chevy MonteCarlo painted white with blue and carrying his famed number 48, Gurney qualified seventh and easily ran with the leaders.  Displaying his usual fluid style, Gurney raced up to second place, and was running third when the input shaft in the transmission let go, something Dan later said he had never seen happen before or since.

With Shelby-American Racing

Gurney was recruited by Carroll Shelby, who was mounting a Ford-powered challenge to Ferrari's dominance of the FIA 2+ liter GT class in the World Championship of Makes for the 1964 season.  Shelby developed the Shelby Daytona Coupe, a derivative of the AC Cobra that had competed the previous year, with a lower drag coupe body.  The team of Gurney and Bob Bondurant drove the Shelby Coupe to a GT class win, fourth overall, in the 1964 24 Hours of Le Mans and Gurney took it to another class win, third overall, in the RAC Tourist Trophy race.  Ford's hopes for edging Ferrari for the Manufacturers' title at the 1000 km Monza season finale were dashed when the event was cancelled.  In 1965 Ford teams won the Manufacturers' title for the GT class, although Gurney was only with Shelby for Le Mans and did not finish.

Gurney joined the Shelby-American campaign in the Sports Prototype class for 1966, which fielded the new 7 liter GT40 Mk II.  Gurney's best finish that year was second place, teamed with Jerry Grant in a Mk II at the 24 Hours of Daytona.  Between success with the new Mk II and the older GT40s, Ford secured the World Championship of Makes for sports cars, sealed by a resounding 1-2-3 finish at the 24 Hours of Le Mans.

Gurney stayed with Shelby-American for their 1967 World Sportscar Championship campaign.  Things were not going smoothly in development of Ford's next Prototype entry.  After problems highlighted by the fatal accident of Ken Miles in testing the Mark III "J Car," another iteration was designed but it would not be built in time for the season opener at the 24 Hours of Daytona.  After a dismal showing at Daytona with the Mk II, Shelby introduced the Mk IV at the 12 Hours of Sebring with a resounding win by Mario Andretti.  After that demonstration the Mk IVs were held in preparation for Le Mans, with Ford's hopes for a repeat championship resting on the GT40s and GT40-derived Mirages campaigned by other teams in the intervening races.  A controversial decision to withhold points from the Mirage win at the Spa 1000 km event from Ford's season credit virtually killed hopes for a repeat championship and gave Le Mans an all-or-nothing aspect for Ford.  Four Mk IVs were entered, two with Shelby-American and two with Holman and Moody, Ford's unofficial NASCAR team.

Pre-race press chatter about the Mk IV's prospects, and in particular about Shelby's team of Gurney and Indy car driver A. J. Foyt, was negative: the Mk IV was too heavy and put too much demand on its brakes, it was structurally weak, it would be difficult to control, Foyt the oval racer was in over his head, Foyt would try to prove himself in the shadow of sportscar master Gurney, and so on.  The static about Foyt was more stereotype than reality, as he had shown his road course mettle with a second-place showing at the grueling 12 Hours of Sebring in a Mk II earlier that year.  As it turned out the race went like clockwork for Gurney and Foyt, establishing an early lead and a comfortable margin over the rival Ferraris, driving at a disciplined pace, and establishing a new record of 388 laps.  On the podium, Gurney took the magnum of champagne and saw an opportunity for a playfully pointed statement towards journalists he saw crowding around.  He shook the bottle and aimed the spritz at the naysayers.  Soon he was giving everyone a shower, which became a podium tradition.

Ford's factory efforts for the World Sportscar Championship ended that year, as a new engine capacity limit of 3 liters for the Sports Prototype class made their entries ineligible and they had no engines that could be eligible and competitive.  Shelby and Gurney independently turned their efforts to the SCCA Trans-Am series for 1968.  Shelby and Gurney teamed up again in 1970, with Shelby hired for Gurney's All American Racing team.

Cannonball Run
In November 1971, Gurney and co-driver Brock Yates won the first competitive running of the Cannonball Baker Sea-To-Shining-Sea Memorial Trophy Dash, known widely as the Cannonball Run, an unofficial, unsanctioned automobile race from New York City to Redondo Beach, California. Gurney and Yates received no prize for winning; however, the winning car is now part of a private collection and valued at several million dollars.

Full-time team owner

Upon his retirement from Formula One, Gurney devoted himself full-time to his role as car maker and team owner. He was the sole owner, Chairman and CEO of All American Racers from 1970 until his son, Justin, assumed the title of CEO in early 2011. The team won 78 races (including the Indianapolis 500, the 12 Hours of Sebring, and the 24 Hours of Daytona) and eight championships, while Gurney's Eagle race car customers also won three Indianapolis 500 races and three championships.

In 1978, Gurney wrote an open memo to other race car owners with what is now known as the "White Paper" in which Gurney called for a series controlled more by the owners or "actual participants" than under the USAC banner. After much debate, CART was formed with Gurney and other owners like Roger Penske, Pat Patrick, and Bob Fletcher. CART began its first full season of competition in March 1979 and thus the first split in open wheel racing began.

AAR withdrew from the CART series in 1986, but enjoyed tremendous success with Toyota in the IMSA GTP series, where in 1992 and 1993 Toyota Eagles won 17 consecutive races, back-to-back Drivers' and Manufacturers' Championships, and wins in the endurance classics of Daytona and Sebring.

The team returned to CART as the factory Toyota team in 1996, but left again after the 1999 season when Goodyear withdrew from the series and Toyota ended their relationship with the team. In 2000, Dan campaigned a Toyota Atlantic car for his son, Alex Gurney under the AAR banner.

In 1990, Gurney was inducted into the International Motorsports Hall of Fame. He is also a member of the Sebring International Raceway Hall of Fame, and the West Coast Stock Car Hall of Fame.

He was inducted into the Motorsports Hall of Fame of America in 1991.

Death
In 2018 Gurney died of complications from pneumonia; he was 86 years old. All American Racers announced the news on its website: "With one last smile on his handsome face, Dan drove off into the unknown just before noon today, January 14, 2018. In deepest sorrow, with gratitude in our hearts for the love and joy you have given us during your time on this earth, we say 'Godspeed.'"

Gurney was survived by his wife, Evi, six children, and 8 grandchildren. As per his final wishes, his memorial service and funeral were private.

Racing record

Complete Formula One World Championship results

(key) (Races in bold indicate pole position; races in italics indicate fastest lap)

Non-Championship results

(key) (Races in bold indicate pole position)
(Races in italics indicate fastest lap)

24 Hours of Le Mans results

Complete British Saloon Car Championship results
(key) (Races in bold indicate pole position; races in italics indicate fastest lap.)

NASCAR results
(key) (Bold – Pole position awarded by qualifying time. Italics – Pole position earned by points standings or practice time. * – Most laps led.)

Grand National Series

Winston Cup Series

Daytona 500

Complete USAC Championship Car results

Indy 500 results

Further reading
Phil Henny,  Dan Gurney – Nostalgie, 2019

See also

 Riverside International Automotive Museum

Notes

References
 Eagle-eye. Dan Gurney's All American Racers.
 Dan Gurney. GP Encyclopedia. The Motorsport Company.
 Blinkhorn, Robert. Dan Gurney. Grand Prix Racing—The Whole Story.
 David, Dennis. Dan Gurney . Grand Prix History.
 Horton, Roger (1999). Remember Jim Clark. Atlas Formula One Journal.
 The Gurney Flap.All American Racers – Gurney Flap.
 The Greatest 33
 Gurney's Career NASCAR Starts

External links

 Dan Gurney's All-American Racers
 Official Gurney-Weslake home page
 

1931 births
2018 deaths
24 Hours of Daytona drivers
24 Hours of Le Mans drivers
24 Hours of Le Mans winning drivers
12 Hours of Reims drivers
American Formula One drivers
Anglo American Racers Formula One drivers
Brabham Formula One drivers
British Touring Car Championship drivers
BRM Formula One drivers
United States Army soldiers
Ferrari Formula One drivers
Formula One race winners
Formula One team owners
Formula One team principals
Indianapolis 500 drivers
International Motorsports Hall of Fame inductees
McLaren Formula One drivers
Motorsport announcers
NASCAR drivers
People from Port Jefferson, New York
Porsche Formula One drivers
Racing drivers from California
Sportspeople from Riverside, California
Trans-Am Series drivers
World Sportscar Championship drivers
Deaths from pneumonia in California
Manhasset High School alumni
12 Hours of Sebring drivers
IndyCar Series team owners